Nikolay Nikolaev (born 19 March 1997) is a Bulgarian professional footballer who plays as a right-back for Hebar Pazardzhik.

Honours

Club
Lokomotiv Plovdiv
 Bulgarian Cup: 2019–20
 Bulgarian Supercup: 2020

References

External links

1997 births
Living people
Bulgarian footballers
First Professional Football League (Bulgaria) players
FC Hebar Pazardzhik players
PFC Spartak Pleven players
PFC Dobrudzha Dobrich players
PFC Lokomotiv Plovdiv players
FC Tsarsko Selo Sofia players
PFC Beroe Stara Zagora players
Association football defenders